Gabriel Rodrigo Castillo (born 12 October 1996) is a Spanish-born Argentine former motorcycle racer.

Career statistics

Grand Prix motorcycle racing

By season

By class

Races by year
(key) (Races in bold indicate pole position, races in italics indicate fastest lap)

External links

1996 births
Living people
Argentine motorcycle racers
Moto3 World Championship riders
Sportspeople from Barcelona
Moto2 World Championship riders